Edmund John Rowe (21 July 1920 – 17 December 1989) was an English first-class cricketer active 1949–59 who played for Nottinghamshire (awarded county cap 1954). He was born in Netherfield; died in Bridlington.

References

1920 births
1989 deaths
English cricketers
Nottinghamshire cricketers